Newcastle is an electoral district of the Legislative Assembly in the Australian state of New South Wales named after and including Newcastle. It is represented since the 2014 Newcastle by-election by Tim Crakanthorp of the Australian Labor Party.

The district takes in the eastern part of the City of Newcastle, including the parts of the suburbs from Hexham to Mayfield lying to the east of the Main North railway line, Broadmeadow, Hamilton South, Merewether Heights and Merewether and the suburbs further east, including central Newcastle and Hamilton. It also includes the Port Stephens Council suburbs of Fern Bay and Fullerton Cove.

History
Newcastle was created in 1859 from part of North Eastern Boroughs. It gained a second member in 1880 and a third member in 1889. With the abolition of multi-member electorates in 1894, it was divided into Newcastle East, Newcastle West, Kahibah, Waratah and Wickham. These changes to the electoral boundaries were debated. Newcastle was re-created in the 1904 re-distribution of electorates following the 1903 New South Wales referendum, which required the number of members of the Legislative Assembly to be reduced from 125 to 90. It consisted of Newcastle East and part of Newcastle West. With the introduction of proportional representation in 1920, it absorbed Kahibah, Wallsend and Wickham and elected five members. With the end of proportional representation in 1927, Newcastle was split into the single-member electorates of Newcastle, Hamilton, Kahibah and Wallsend.

It has since been usually held by the Labor Party. This pattern was threatened in early 2007, when sitting member Bryce Gaudry lost his preselection to a former local newsreader, Jodi McKay. Gaudry opted to stand as an independent and as a consequence split the Labor Party's vote. Independent former Lord Mayor of Newcastle John Tate came close to winning the seat after preferences but McKay managed to hold on. Labor's previous margin of over 15% had been slashed to as little as 1.4%, making it one of Labor's most marginal seats.

At the 2011 New South Wales state election, Liberal Tim Owen defeated incumbent and one-term member McKay and popular Independent Tate, marking the first time the Liberals or their predecessors had won Newcastle as a single-member seat in over a century. This was one of many gains the Liberals made in what was previously Labor heartland.

Owen became an independent and moved to the crossbench on 6 August 2014 after accusations at the Independent Commission Against Corruption (ICAC). He resigned from parliament on 12 August 2014 after evidence of corruption was uncovered. The Liberals opted not to contest the ensuing by-election, which saw Labor's Tim Crakanthorp reclaim the seat handily.

Members for Newcastle

Election results

References

Newcastle
Politics of Newcastle, New South Wales
1859 establishments in Australia
Newcastle
1894 disestablishments in Australia
Newcastle
1904 establishments in Australia
Newcastle